Stephen Gough is a Canadian politician, who was elected to the Nova Scotia House of Assembly in the 2013 provincial election. A member of the Nova Scotia Liberal Party, he represents the electoral district of Sackville-Beaver Bank.

Electoral record

|-

|Liberal
|Stephen Gough
|align="right"|2,570
|align="right"|40.21
|align="right"|
|-

|New Democratic Party
|Mat Whynott 
|align="right"|2,369
|align="right"|37.07
|align="right"| 
|-

|Progressive Conservative
| Sarah Reeves
|align="right"|1,452
|align="right"|22.72
|align="right"|

|}

References

Year of birth missing (living people)
Living people
Nova Scotia Liberal Party MLAs
People from the Halifax Regional Municipality
Black Canadian politicians
21st-century Canadian politicians